There were two characters named Epeius (Ancient Greek: Ἐπειός Epeiós) or Epeus in Greek mythology.

 Epeius, an Elean prince as son of King Endymion. He ran a race at Olympia, against his brothers Aetolus and Paeon, winning his father's kingdom. Epeius' other siblings were Eurycyda and possibly Naxos. He was married to Anaxiroe, daughter of Coronus, and had one daughter, Hyrmine. King Oenomaus of Pisa was his contemporary. From him the Epei derived their name.
Epeius, a Greek soldier during the Trojan War and builder of the Trojan horse.

Namesake 
 2148 Epeios, Jovian asteroid

Notes

References 

 Apollodorus, The Library with an English Translation by Sir James George Frazer, F.B.A., F.R.S. in 2 Volumes, Cambridge, MA, Harvard University Press; London, William Heinemann Ltd. 1921. ISBN 0-674-99135-4. Online version at the Perseus Digital Library. Greek text available from the same website.
 Pausanias, Description of Greece with an English Translation by W.H.S. Jones, Litt.D., and H.A. Ormerod, M.A., in 4 Volumes. Cambridge, MA, Harvard University Press; London, William Heinemann Ltd. 1918. . Online version at the Perseus Digital Library
 Pausanias, Graeciae Descriptio. 3 vols. Leipzig, Teubner. 1903.  Greek text available at the Perseus Digital Library.
 Publius Vergilius Maro, Aeneid. Theodore C. Williams. trans. Boston. Houghton Mifflin Co. 1910. Online version at the Perseus Digital Library.
 Publius Vergilius Maro, Bucolics, Aeneid, and Georgics. J. B. Greenough. Boston. Ginn & Co. 1900. Latin text available at the Perseus Digital Library.
 Stephanus of Byzantium, Stephani Byzantii Ethnicorum quae supersunt, edited by August Meineike (1790-1870), published 1849. A few entries from this important ancient handbook of place names have been translated by Brady Kiesling. Online version at the Topos Text Project.

Kings of Elis
Kings in Greek mythology
Elean mythology